Abdul Malik Abdul Bashir (born 11 January 1968) is a Singaporean association football referee. He refereed in the 2011 AFC Asian Cup, the first leg of the 2008 AFC Champions League Final. and 2013 AFC Cup Final

References

External links
 
 

1968 births
Living people
Singaporean football referees
Place of birth missing (living people)
AFC Asian Cup referees